Local governance reform in the Canadian province of New Brunswick was implemented on January 1, 2023. This resulted in a significant reorganization of the municipal entities in the province, including a reduction in the number of entities from 340 to 89, consisting of 77 local governments and 12 rural districts nested within 12 regional service commissions. The local governance reform review was commenced by the Government of New Brunswick in January 2021 and was promoted as the most consequential restructuring of the local governance system since Premier Robichaud's Equal Opportunity Program.

Background 

Immediately prior to the 2023 reform, New Brunswick's local governance system consisted of 340 entities including 104 local governments (i.e., municipalities), 236 local service districts, and 12 regional service commissions. Following the appointment of Daniel Allain as Minister of Local Government and Local Governance Reform, the Government of New Brunswick commenced the reform of the system on January 19, 2021; its first significant local governance reform in 60 years. The intent of the reform was to modernize the local governance system due to a lack of elected local government representation for more than 30 per cent of the province's population, redundancies in the delivery of services and infrastructure, and to address challenges for communities in the delivery of services. The reform was announced to be multiphase in nature and featured stakeholder engagement.

Public engagement commenced in April 2021 with the release of a local governance reform green paper. The paper outlines four topics to guide engagement including the current local governance structure, regional collaboration, land use planning, and finance. An advisory committee was established to steer the reform process with working groups created for each of the four engagement topics. Public engagement sessions were scheduled for mid-May 2021 with a deadline of May 31 for the public to submit its input. An engagement report was published in September 2021, summarizing feedback received from stakeholders and the public. A round of meetings to discuss the engagement summary report ensued.

The Government of New Brunswick announced its initial plan to reform the province's local governance system in a white paper published in November 2021. A reduction in the current system of 340 entities to 90 entities – 78 local governments and 12 rural districts – was proposed. For the 12 rural districts, a structure was proposed featuring advisory committees with members elected in November 2022. It was announced that the restructuring transition process would be financed by the provincial government.

Revisions to the initial plan were announced in December 2021 based on feedback arising from review of the initial plan. Revisions included the geographic reconfiguration of numerous proposed entities that resulted in a net reduction of the proposed local governments from 78 to 77. One proposed local government was merged into another, one proposed local government was deleted with its geography distributed into two others, and one proposed local government was split into two. While most revisions were well-received, the movement of the Chiasson-Savoy local service district from Shippagan to Île-de-Lamèque in a court case that was not resolved until October 2022.

The proposed names of the 77 local governments and 12 rural districts were announced on May 25, 2022; The names were officially set on August 30, 2022, and took effect on January 1, 2023; the boundary descriptions used in previous consolidated regulations have been replaced entirely by maps.

Unlike changes to boundaries, the financial component of the local governance reform was implemented piecemeal. Phase one of the white paper's financial reform plan included property taxation adjustments and changes to the community funding and equalization grant. Among the most notable changes for local governments was the ability to increase the tax rate on non-residential properties up to 1.7 times the local rate. Plans for phase two are still underway, though the provincial government has already committed to reduced its own tax rate on nonresidential properties over three years. In addition to changes proposed in the white paper, new possibilities like decoupling apartments from the rest of the non-owner occupied residential tax class are also being considered. 

Changes to the community funding and equalization grant occurred in the fall. In May 2022, an independent expert panel was also commissioned to study the community funding and equalization grant system in New Brunswick and make recommendations on how to improve it to the government. The resulting report on Provincial Municipal Fiscal Arrangements in New Brunswick was released on September 28, 2022. Ultimately, the government chose to implement some components of the expert panel's report but did not implement their new equalization formula. On October 4, 2022, Minister Allain introduced amendments in the legislature outlining the government's new funding mechanism. The changes imposed a fixed annual rate for community funding of just under $76 million until 2028, redirected core funding to support the priorities of the regional service commissions, and introduced an updated equalization formula. Under the new formula, payments will be adjusted for annual tax base growth compared to the provincial tax base growth to a maximum of three per cent. Any reduced need for equalization funding will be redirected, along with the core funding revenue, to help support the expanded mandates of regional service commissions.

List of local governments  
The local governance reform resulted in 77 local governments. The initial white paper proposals were revised after a period of consultation and some changes made. The regulation that made the names and boundaries official was filed on August 30, 2022, with the various changes taking effect on January 1, 2023.

List of regional service commissions 

The local governance reform will continue the existence of New Brunswick's 12 regional service commissions. Each regional service commission will have one rural district. Two RSCs will be renamed in 2023.

Acadian Peninsula
Capital Region (formerly Regional Service Commission 11)
Chaleur
Fundy
Greater Miramichi
Kent
Kings (formerly Regional Service Commission 8)
Northwest
Restigouche
Southeast
Southwest New Brunswick
Western Valley

List of rural districts 
The local governance reform will result in 12 rural districts. The proposed names of the rural districts were announced on May 25, 2022 and became official on July 21, 2022 when the Rural Districts Establishment Regulation was filed.

See also 

New Brunswick
Administrative divisions of New Brunswick
List of communities in New Brunswick
List of local service districts in New Brunswick
List of municipal amalgamations in New Brunswick 
List of municipalities in New Brunswick
List of parishes in New Brunswick
2022 New Brunswick municipal elections

Elsewhere in Canada
2000–06 municipal reorganization in Quebec
2002–2006 municipal reorganization of Montreal
2015 Manitoba municipal amalgamations
Amalgamation of the Halifax Regional Municipality
Amalgamation of Toronto
Edmonton annexations

Notes

References

Further reading 
Working together for vibrant and sustainable communities
Green Paper
What We Heard
White Paper
New Brunswick reforms merge dozens of local governments and rural areas

External links 
Government of New Brunwick: Local Governance Reform
Entity Maps by Region
Frequently Asked Questions
Proposed Legal Names of Entities
Publications, studies and data

 
Mergers of administrative divisions in Canada